Gunneklevfjord is a small fjord at the head of Frierfjord in Porsgrunn municipality in Telemark county, Norway. 

The west side of Gunneklevfjord is defined by the peninsula of Herøya, at the mouth of Telemarksvassdraget. Herøya features a large industrial park that was founded in 1928.  It contains major facilities of Norsk Hydro, Yara, and REC (ScanWafer subsidiary).   The east side of Gunneklevfjord belongs to Skrapeklev, part of the village of Herøya, a suburb of the city of Porsgrunn.  

Gunneklevfjord's mouth lies to the north where the Porsgrunn River discharges into the Frierfjord at Norsk Hydro's factory complex.  The Skien River, which begins in Skien, is called the Porsgrunn River as it runs through Porsgrunn. Small watercraft traffic can also pass through a canal at the south of the fjord.

References

Porsgrunn
Fjords of Vestfold og Telemark